Anthony Wright (born August 3, 1984) is a male field hockey player who played for the Canada national field hockey team as a sweeper.

International senior competitions
 2006 — World Cup Qualifier, Guangzhou (10th)
 2006 — Commonwealth Games, Melbourne (9th)
 2007 — Pan American Games, Rio de Janeiro (1st)
 2008 — Olympic Games, Beijing (10th)

References
 Canadian Olympic Committee

External links
 

1984 births
Living people
Canadian male field hockey players
Field hockey players at the 2006 Commonwealth Games
Field hockey players at the 2007 Pan American Games
Field hockey players at the 2008 Summer Olympics
Olympic field hockey players of Canada
Field hockey players from Vancouver
Commonwealth Games competitors for Canada
Pan American Games gold medalists for Canada
Pan American Games medalists in field hockey
Medalists at the 2007 Pan American Games